The Women's 800m Freestyle event at the 2007 Pan American Games took place at the Maria Lenk Aquatic Park in Rio de Janeiro, Brazil. The first two heats were held on 2007-07-19, while the fastest heat based on entry times was staged a day later.

Medalists

Results

References
agendapan
For the Record, Swimming World Magazine, September 2007 (p. 48+49)

Freestyle, Women's 800m
2007 in women's swimming